S. Phangnon Konyak is an Indian politician from Nagaland. She is the State President of BJP Mahila Morcha, Nagaland. In March 2022, she became the first woman to be elected as Member of Parliament, Rajya Sabha from Nagaland and the second woman from the State to be elected to either House of the Parliament or the State Assembly.

Biography 
She did her schooling from Holy Cross Higher Secondary School, Dimapur. She holds a master's degree in English Literature from Daulat Ram College (University of Delhi) (Batch of 2002) and has been involved in student activism and social organizations.

References 

Living people
People from Nagaland
Bharatiya Janata Party politicians from Nagaland
Rajya Sabha members from Nagaland
Women members of the Rajya Sabha
1978 births